Soo Wincci is a Malaysian Chinese singer, recording artist, actress, composer, celebrity chef, host, model, beauty queen, and entrepreneur from Malaysia. She crowned Miss World Malaysia in 2008 and represented Malaysia in the Miss World 2008 beauty pageant. In 2013, she was selected by Hollywood's Independent Critics as one of the 100 most beautiful women in the world. In 2016 she was awarded the "Top 10 Most Outstanding Young Malaysian Award". In 2018 the Chinese media nicknamed her "The Most Beautiful Dr". She has four entries in the Malaysia Book of Records.

Education

Soo is a law graduate from the University of Reading (UK), an MBA holder from the University of Sunshine Coast, and a PhD recipient in Business administration from Open University Malaysia.

In 2018, she graduated with a master's degree in music production, innovation and technology and later 2019 on with a Post master's degree Fellowship from Berklee College of Music in 2019.

Beauty pageants
Soo Wincci spent almost six years modelling and participated in over twenty pageants until she won her most desired title: Miss World Malaysia in 2008.

In 2004, Wincci won second place in the Miss Malaysia Intercontinental pageant. However, the winner could not join the world pageant so she represented Malaysia in the Miss Intercontinental Pageant in China. She came third in the Miss Malaysia Oriental World pageant in the same year. In 2005, she was the first runner-up in the Miss Chinatown pageant.

In 2008, she won Miss World Malaysia and represented Malaysia in the Miss World beauty pageant in Johannesburg, South Africa. She was a semifinalist for the Miss World Top Model and top finalist for Miss World Talent contests.

Career

2009–2012
In 2009, Soo began her acting career in a local NTV7 Chinese sitcom, titled Mr. Siao's Mandarin Class. She was appointed as SAMSUNG LED ambassador. On 18 August 2009, Soo released her self-composed singing album Soo Wincci. Her music video was sponsored by Samsung. Also, Samsung appointed her song "Beauty With a Purpose" (which was sung in English, Malay, and Chinese) as the theme for Samsung LED.

Soo starred in the Media Corp Chinese drama titled Injustice as well as the second season of Mr. Siao's Mandarin Class in 2010. Soo was also appointed to be the spokesperson for Avon Anew Skin in Malaysia, as well as the ambassador of peace for Universal Peace Federation and the Red Crescent Society. She received a PhD scholarship from Open University Malaysia.

Soo released her first full Chinese album titled Ying Guang in 2011. She acted as Hui Ying in the Mediacorp drama Destiny in Her Hands" and NTV7's legal drama Justice in the City. She also starred in Asia's first 3D thriller Hunter playing the role of a famous host named Hu Jing, aired in Asia in 2012. She composed and sang the movie's theme song. In 2011, she went to the London Media and Film Academy to attend the Acting Masterclass, and the Hosting Masterclass. She also worked on her vocal skills with famous UK singing coach, Kim Chadler.

In 2012, she released her third Chinese album (with her own magazine) titled, In My Heart.

Soo joined the celebrity edition of MasterChef Malaysia, reaching the top-five finalists and became known as the Queen of Desserts. After MasterChef, she launched her Malay EP titled Terus Teranglah.

She launched her first Chinese international album titled Happiness in Taiwan.

2013–2015
In 2013, Soo was selected by Hollywood's Independent Critics for its list the 100 Most Beautiful Face of 2013. She was number 91. In 2014, Soo founded her own talent management company, Beyond Artistes.

Soo won the Media Choice Award in Malaysia's most prestigious Chinese music award (PWH) in 2015. She was selected as the Top 10 Chinese actor and actress for NTV7. She also acted as the main lead for the drama The Injustice Stranger. She held her first solo concert Inwinccible at Plenary Hall in Kuala Lumpur Convention Centre, showcasing her talents in singing, languages as well as stunts. She invested RM500,000 of her own money for the concert after several sponsors pulled out because of a video she posted in August, where she urged the Malaysian Prime Minister, Datuk Seri Najib Razak to resign.

2016-2017

In 2016, she restructured her company Beyond Artistes and settled her concert debts by not receiving income for one year. She performed and acted non-stop to clear her debts and managed to save her company within less than a year. She managed to complete her Ph.D. research and passed her viva voce on 31 May 2016.

Also in 2017 she wrote and produced her first book and audiobook titled Inwinccible X. She also became a music producer by writing, composing and producing her self-created first motivational pop song titled "I Am X A Loser". It has had over half a million views on YouTube. Her Drama I Am Not a Loser was one of the highest rated Chinese dramas of 2017. She held her first motivational speaking tour giving talks at over twenty universities across Malaysia. Her villain role inside "Kau Yang Satu" received good reviews and was successfully being released in cinemas, starring with famous local Malay actor and actress.

2017-2018
In 2017 she was accepted by the Hollywood renowned music school Berklee College of Music to pursue her second Master in Music Production & Innovation. Despite everyone going against her dream, she was determined to end her company Beyond Artistes and went ahead in furthering her studies in overseas. She was also working inside the studio in order to support herself overseas. She also kept attending variety shows in China and was being nicknamed by the China media as "The Most Beautiful Dr". She successfully graduated with her second Master's & was awarded her postmaster fellowship by Berklee Valencia.

2018-2019
She continued her postmaster fellowship while serving the college live sound department. In 2019 upon graduation, she was being awarded 2 records by the Malaysia Book of Records, "Beauty Queen with the Most Achieved Degrees" and "Recording Artist with the Most Achieved Degrees".
She was then being accepted into Spain's No.1 Artistic University which is the University of Polytechnic Valencia in order to pursue her second Ph.D. in artistic production.

2020-2021
She reinvent herself and founded her new production and artistic company called Beyond Inwinccible Tricor. She started to travel non-stop between Spain and Malaysia for work and study. During the beginning of the year, she was being selected as the cultural ambassador for Thean Hou Temple of Malaysia. She was then being selected as the ambassador for the prestige title of Top Ten Most Outstanding Young Malaysian" and also being appointed as Berklee Alumni ambassador. In mid-2020, she broke the news of her new comeback song with Latin Grammy Award Winning Producers. She is now in the midst of her music production.

2022
She was appointed as an associate professor at Universiti Teknologi MARA. The Malaysia Book of Records awarded her as "First Miss World Malaysia Appointed As Associate Professor". Also released a Trilingual Single - Como Esta in July of the same year.

Awards and recognitions
2016: The Malaysia Book of Records as "The First Miss World Malaysia To Receive a PhD"
2016: JCI Ten Outstanding Young Malaysian (TOYM)
2019: The Malaysia Book of Records for "Most Number of Academic Degrees Obtained by a Beauty Queen"
2019: The Malaysia Book of Records for "Most Number of Academic Degrees Obtained by a Recording Artiste"
2022: The Malaysia Book of Records as "First Miss World Malaysia Appointed As Associate Professor"
2022: Malaysia Excellence Celebrity Awards
2022: Malaysia Best Business Awards

References

External links

 
 
 
 
 

1985 births
Living people
People from Selangor
Malaysian beauty pageant winners
Miss World 2008 delegates
Malaysian people of Chinese descent
Malaysian female models
21st-century Malaysian women singers
Malaysian television personalities
University of the Sunshine Coast alumni
Malaysian expatriates in Taiwan